The Northern Illinois Huskies men's basketball team represents Northern Illinois University (NIU) in DeKalb, Illinois. The school's team currently competes in the Mid-American Conference (MAC). The team last played in the NCAA Division I men's basketball tournament in 1996.

History
 1900–01 to 1919–20: Independent
 1920–21 to 1965–66: Illinois Intercollegiate Athletic Conference
 1966–67 to 1967–70: NCAA Division I Independent
 1970–71 to 1971–72: Midwestern Conference
 1972–73 to 1974–75: NCAA Division I Independent
 1975–76 to 1985–86: Mid-American Conference
 1986–87 to 1989–90: NCAA Division I Independent
 1990–91 to 1993–94: Mid-Continent Conference (now known as Summit League)
 1994–95 to 1996–97: Midwestern Collegiate Conference (now known as Horizon League)
 1997–98 to present: Mid-American Conference

The All-Century Team

Best of Northern Illinois Men’s Basketball (1900-2000)
The Northern Illinois University athletic department celebrated 100 years of Huskies basketball in the 2000–01 season. A panel of 29 Administrators, NIU Staff/Faculty, NIU Alumni, Media and NIU Media Services were given the opportunity to cast votes for the greatest players to ever don the cardinal and black of Northern Illinois University, resulting in a total of 46 players. Eighty-six different Huskie players received at least one vote, including 33 Northern Illinois Hall of Famers, plus 12 performers either drafted or signed as free agents by the National Basketball Association. Members of the All-Century Team were acknowledged at halftime of the NIU-Ball State Cardinals men's basketball game on Saturday February 17, 2001 in Chick Evans Field House.

Season-by-season records

Source: NIU Men's Basketball Record Book

Conference Tournament results

MAC tournament
The Huskies have won the MAC tournament once in 1982.

Source: MAC Men's Basketball Tournament History

The Summit League tournament

 Source: Summit League History

Horizon League tournament
The Huskies have won the Horizon League tournament once in 1996.

 Source: Horizon League Records

Postseason

NCAA tournament results
The Huskies have appeared in the NCAA tournament three times. Their overall record is 0–3.

NCAA Division II Tournament results
The Huskies appeared in one NCAA Division II tournament. Their record is 0–2.

Vegas 16 results
The Huskies appeared in one Vegas 16. Their record is 0–1.

Rashon Burno – Head Coach
Steve Christiansen – Assistant Coach 
Drew Gladstone - Assistant Coach
Branden McDonald – Assistant Coach
Matt Fleming – Director of Basketball Operations
TBA – Assistant Director of Basketball Operations

See also
NIU Huskies women's basketball

References

External links